Birriwa is a locality in central New South Wales, Australia.

Birriwa is located on the Castlereagh Highway in the central west of New South Wales between Gulgong  and Dunedoo.

The Gwabegar railway line came to Birriwa  and a station was opened there in 1909.  There is no longer a passenger service,  but a large grain silo remains in operation where the railway line crosses the Castlereagh Highway at a level crossing.

The Chinese bushranger Sam Poo shot and killed policeman John Ward at Birriwa in 1865.

References

Towns in New South Wales
Towns in the Central West (New South Wales)